Thorkil Kristensen (9 October 1899 – 26 June 1989) was a Danish politician, finance minister, professor in national economy, and futurist.

Early years 
Kristensen was born a son of a farmer in Fløjstrup close to Vejle, Denmark. Between 1938–1945 he was professor at the University of Aarhus and between 1947–1960 at the Copenhagen Business School.

Career 
Thorkil Kristensen was elected to the Danish Parliament 1945 and became finance minister under Knud Kristiansen (1945–1947) and Erik Eriksen (1950–1953). Throughout his life he worked with difficult economic problems. Among people of his own party and opposing parties, he enjoyed great respect because of his broad knowledge of economics.

He came to disagree on economic policy with his party, Venstre, and left the party in 1960.

After his exit from politics, he was secretary general of the OECD from 1960-1969. He was the founder of the Copenhagen Institute for Futures Studies (CIFS), making it one of the first futures research institutes on the European continent. He was managing director at CIFS from 1970–1988.

He participated in the Club of Rome which attracted considerable public attention with its report, Limits to Growth, which has sold 30 million copies in more than 30 translations, making it the best selling environmental book in world history.

Selected publications 
 Kristensen, Thorkil. The economic world balance. The economic world balance. (1960).
 Kristensen, Thorkil. The brain drain and development planning. No. 29. International Institute for Educational Planning, 1968.
 Kristensen, Thorkil. The food problem of developing countries. Organisation for Economic Cooperation and Development, 1968.
 Kristensen, Thorkil. Development in rich and poor countries: a general theory with statistical analyses. Praeger, 1974.'

Articles, a selection
 Kristensen, Thorkil. "Five Years of OECD." European Yearbook 13 (1967): 1000-113.

References

External links 
 Truman Library - Thorkil Kristensen Oral History Interview 

1899 births
1989 deaths
Danish economists
Futurologists
Danish Finance Ministers
Members of the Folketing
Venstre (Denmark) politicians
Academic staff of Copenhagen Business School
People from Vejle Municipality
20th-century Danish politicians